The 2013–14 Eurocup Basketball Knockout stage was the last phase in the competition. Eight-finals started on March 4 and the Finals were played on May 1–7.

All times are CET (UTC+1).

Round of 16
The eight-finals were two-legged ties determined on aggregate score. The first legs were played on March 4–5 and return legs were played on March 11–12. The group winner in each tie, listed as "Team #1", hosted the second leg.

Game 1

Game 2

Quarterfinals
The quarterfinals are two-legged ties determined on aggregate score. The first legs will be played on March 18–19 and return legs will be played on March 25–26. The team listed as "Team #1", hosts the second leg.

Game 1

Game 2

Semifinals
The semifinals are two-legged ties determined on aggregate score. The first legs will be played on April 1–2 and return legs will be played on April 9. The team listed as "Team #1", hosts the second leg.

Game 1

Game 2

Finals

Game 1

Game 2

References

2013–14 Eurocup Basketball